Luther V. Harris Jr. (August 27, 1923 – February 3, 1986) was an American professional basketball player. He played in the National Basketball League for the Sheboygan Red Skins and Tri-Cities Blackhawks and averaged 6.7 points per game.

References

1923 births
1986 deaths
American men's basketball players
Basketball players from Illinois
Forwards (basketball)
Guards (basketball)
People from Madison County, Illinois
Sheboygan Red Skins players
Tri-Cities Blackhawks players